La Gazeta de Caracas was the first newspaper printed in Venezuela; its first issue was published on October 24, 1808. In 1814, its name changed to Gaceta de Caracas. The newspaper was issued, with some interruptions, until January 1822.

It was printed by the Britons Matthew Gallagher and James Lamb, who had brought a printing press from Trinidad. They became the first typographers working in Venezuela.

The newspaper published news and ideas favorable toward the current government, which would subject it to rapid changes in editorial policies as the Venezuelan War of Independence raged; its sympathies alternated between royalist and republican, somewhat undermining its credibility.

Andrés Bello was almost permanently editor of the newspaper until it changed name in 1814.

The significance of having newspapers in South America at the turn of the 19th century has been linked to the causation of nationalism worldwide. This idea is explored in Benedict Anderson's book Imagined Communities.

References

Sources

External links

Defunct newspapers published in Venezuela
Mass media in Caracas
Newspapers published in Venezuela
Publications established in 1808
Publications disestablished in 1822
Spanish-language newspapers